Linus Alexander Sköld (born 1983) is a Swedish politician, teacher and member of the Riksdag, the national legislature. A member of the Social Democratic Party, he has represented Norrbotten County since January 2019. He had previously been a substitute member of the Riksdag four times: September 2015 to April 2016 (for Sven-Erik Bucht]); February 2017 to August 2017 (for Hannah Bergstedt); April 2018 to June 2018 (for Hannah Bergstedt); and September 2018 to January 2019 (for Sven-Erik Bucht).

Sköld is the son of service technician Rolf Sköld and teacher June Sköld (née Schön). He was educated in Malmö. He has a teaching degree from Malmö University and a degree in educational leadership from Umeå University. He has been a teacher since 2008. He has been a member of the municipal council in Älvsbyn Municipality since 2016.

References

1983 births
Living people
Malmö University alumni
Members of the Riksdag 2018–2022
Members of the Riksdag 2022–2026
Members of the Riksdag from the Social Democrats
People from Norrbotten County
Swedish schoolteachers
Umeå University alumni